Byars is a surname. Notable people with the surname include:

Angela Byars-Winston, American psychologist
Betsy Byars (1928–2020), American author
Bryan Byars (born 1991), American soccer player
Dennis Byars (1940-2022), American politician
Derrick Byars (born 1984), American basketball player and entrepreneur
James Lee Byars (1932–1997), American conceptual artist and performance artist 
Keith Byars (born 1963), American sports broadcaster and former American football fullback 
Margaret Bell-Byars (born 1962), American gospel musician